Just for a Song is a 1930 British musical film directed by Gareth Gundrey and starring Lillian Hall-Davis, Roy Royston and Constance Carpenter. It was made at Islington Studios. Some singing and dancing sequences were photographed in an early colour process, believed to be Pathécolor. This film is believed to be lost.

Main cast
 Lillian Hall-Davis as Norma Wentworth 
 Roy Royston as Jack 
 Constance Carpenter as Jill 
 Cyril Ritchard as Craddock 
 Nick Adams as Agent 
 Syd Crossley as Stage Manager
 Dick Henderson
 Albert Rebla 
 Syd Seymour and His Mad Hatters as Themselves

References

Bibliography
Wood, Linda. British Films, 1927–1939. British Film Institute, 1986.

External links

See also
List of early color feature films
List of lost films

1930 films
1930s color films
1930 lost films
British musical films
1930 musical films
British films based on plays
Films directed by Gareth Gundrey
Gainsborough Pictures films
Islington Studios films
British black-and-white films
Lost British films
Lost musical films
1930s English-language films
1930s British films